United Nations Security Council resolution 1499, adopted unanimously on 13 August 2003, after recalling previous resolutions on the situation in the Democratic Republic of the Congo, including resolutions 1457 (2003) and 1493 (2003), the Council extended the mandate of a panel investigating the plundering of natural resources in the country until 31 October 2003.

The Security Council welcomed the establishment of a transitional national government in the Democratic Republic of the Congo, but noted that illegal exploitation of the country's natural resources continued to take place, particularly in the east. It recognised that the exchange of information and attempts to resolve issues would assist in the transparency of the panel's work, highlight the issue of the exploitation of natural resources and the connections with arms trafficking.

The Secretary-General Kofi Annan was requested to extend the investigative panel's mandate until 31 October 2003, when it would be due to report its findings. The resolution reiterated the council's demand that all relevant states immediately end the illegal exploitation of natural resources in the Democratic Republic of the Congo. The panel was instructed to provide information to the concerned governments in order for them to take appropriate action.

The investigative panel named individuals and companies implicated in illegal activities and which further measures would be taken.

See also
 Kivu conflict
 Ituri conflict
 List of United Nations Security Council Resolutions 1401 to 1500 (2002–2003)
 Lusaka Ceasefire Agreement
 Second Congo War

References

External links
 
Text of the Resolution at undocs.org

 1499
2003 in the Democratic Republic of the Congo
 1499
 1499
August 2003 events